Judy Malloy (born Judith Ann Powers January 9, 1942) is a poet whose works embrace the intersection of hypernarrative, magic realism, and information art. Beginning with Uncle Roger in 1986, Malloy has composed works in both new media literature and hypertext fiction. She was an early creator of online interactive and collaborative fiction on The WELL and the website ArtsWire.

Malloy has served as editor and leader for books and web projects. Her literary works have been exhibited worldwide.  Recently she has been a Digital Studies Fellow at the Rutgers Camden Digital Studies Center (2016-2017) and a Visiting Lecturer at Princeton University in Social Media Poetics (2013) and Electronic Literature (2014).

Biography

Early life and education
Born in Boston a month after the attack on Pearl Harbor, Malloy was raised in Massachusetts. Her mother was a journalist and newspaper editor, and her father, a Normandy veteran, worked as an assistant district attorney in two Massachusetts counties and then as Chief Assistant US Attorney for Massachusetts. Malloy skied and played tennis, summering in New Hampshire, Cape Cod, and the Berkshires. Malloy felt an early calling to the visual arts and began painting and sketching as a child.

Career
After graduating from Middlebury College with a degree in literature and work in studio art and art history, Malloy took a job at the Library of Congress; she also traveled in Europe. In the next few years, while writing and making art, Malloy worked as a technical information specialist at the NASA contractor Ball Brothers Research Corporation, running their technical library and learning FORTRAN programming in order to identify relevant content for research.  Malloy moved to the East Bay in the mid 1970s and lived in Berkeley where, in addition to installations and performances, she developed a series of artist's books that incorporated non-sequential narratives driven by words and images.

Her papers are currently being collected by the David M. Rubenstein Rare Book & Manuscript Library at Duke University.

Online
In 1986, Malloy wrote and programmed Uncle Roger, the first online hyperfiction project with links that took the narrative in different directions depending on the reader's choice. The Wall Street Journal mentioned Uncle Roger as the start of a future art form in their 1989 centennial publication. Uncle Roger was a three-part hypertextual "narrabase" (narrative database) that used keyword searching (including Boolean operators) and appeared on Art Com Electronic Network on the WELL.

In 1988, Malloy became the coordinating editor of FineArt Forum, under the Leonardo publishing umbrella, and developed F. A. S. T. (Fine Art Science and Technology), a resource on the Whole Earth 'Lectronic Link (The WELL) bulletin board. Malloy was the initial editor of Leonardo Electronic News, 1991–1993, now Leonardo Electronic Almanac. For Leonardo, she worked to make the work of new media artists more visible, creating the artists' "Words on Works" (WOW) Project, published in Leonardo Electronic News and Leonardo.

Malloy's hyperfiction work its name was Penelope was exhibited in 1989 at the Richmond Art Center and published in 1993 by Eastgate Systems. Also in 1993, Malloy was invited to XEROX PARC as an artist-in-residence, where she developed Brown House Kitchen, an online narrative written in LambdaMOO. Malloy then wrote l0ve0ne, published in 1994 by Eastgate Web Workshop as their first work. Malloy created Making Art Online] in 1994. One of the first arts websites, Making Art Online is currently hosted by the Walker Art Center.

Between 1993 and 1996, while working with PARC, Malloy and Cathy Marshall (hypertext developer) collaborated on "Closure Was Never a Goal in this Piece", an article published in the book Wired Women which documented their experiences working on their other project, Forward Anywhere: Notes on an Exchange between Intersecting Lives, a hypernarrative work based on electronic communication that passed between the two in which they sought "to exchange the remembered and day-to-day substance of our lives".

Malloy worked for Arts Wire, a program of the New York Foundation for the Arts (NYFA) from its early origins in 1993. She began serving as editor of the online periodical Arts Wire Current in March 1996. She continued as editor through the periodical's name change to NYFA Current in November, 2002, until March 2004.

Malloy is the editor of Women, Art & Technology (MIT Press, 2003), a documentation of the central role of female artists in the development of new media. The book lays out a historical outline of the female influence in art and technology including papers written by notable members of the field. She is also the editor of  content | code | process (formerly called Authoring Software), a website of resources related to the authoring tools used for hypertext and other forms of database-driven writing. Her most recent work is the 2010 new media poetry trilogy Paths of Memory and Painting, the first part of which appeared in 2008 under the title where every luminous landscape.

Her work has been exhibited and published internationally including the 2008 Electronic Literature Conference, San Francisco Art Institute, Tisch School of the Arts, New York University, São Paulo Art Biennial, the Los Angeles Institute for Contemporary Art, Boston Cyberarts Festival, the Walker Art Center, Visual Studies Workshop, Berkeley Art Center, Finger Lakes Environmental Film Festival, Centenary of Carmen Conde, Cartagena, Spain, Istanbul Contemporary Art Museum and the Hellenic American Union in Athens, Houston Center for Photography, Richmond Art Center, San Antonio Art Institute, A Space, Toronto, Canada, National Library of Madrid, Eastgate Systems, E. P. Dutton, Tanam Press, Seal Press, MIT Press, The Iowa Review Web, and Blue Moon Review. Malloy's where every luminous landscape (2008) was exhibited at The Future of Writing, University of California, Irvine, November, 2008 and the E-Poetry Festival, Barcelona, May, 2009. In May 2009 it was a finalist in the prix poésie-média 2009 hosted by the Biennale Internationale des poetes (BIPVAL) in Val de Marne, France.

Editing and essays
Malloy was the editor of the July 2016 MIT Press book, Social Media Archeology and Poetics.
 Chapter 31. A Way Is Open: Allusion, Authoring System, Identity, and Audience in Early Text-Based Electronic Literature

Selected works
Artists Books (1977–1993)
Landscape Projects (1978–)
Installations (1979–1995)

Uncle Roger (1986–1987) (2003 revised edition)
Bad Information (1986–1988)
OK Research, OK Genetic Engineering (1988) information art describes technology
YOU! (1991), online poem with multiple contributors, programmed and produced by Judy Malloy
Wasting Time, A Narrative Data Structure (1992)
its name was Penelope (1993)
l0ve0ne (1994)
name is scibe (1994) a collaboratively created hyperfiction by Judy Malloy, Tom Igoe, Chris Abraham, Tim Collins, Anna Couey, Valerie Gardiner, Joseph Wilson and Doug Cohen
The Roar of Destiny Emanated From the Refrigerator (1995–1999) an epic hyperpoem
Forward Anywhere (1995), a collaborative hyperfiction by Judy Malloy and Cathy Marshall
Dorothy Abrona McCrae (2000)
Interlude — Dorothy and Sid (2001)
A Party At Silver Beach (2002)
Afterwards (2003)

Revelations of Secret Surveillance (2004–2007)
Concerto for Narrative Data (2005–2006, 2008)
The Wedding Celebration of Gunter and Gwen (2006–2007)
Paths of Memory and Painting (2010)
"'A WAY IS OPEN''', Allusion, Identity, Authoring System, and Audience in Early Text-Based Electronic Literature" for Contexts, Forms, and Practices of Electronic Literature''. edited by Dene Grigar and James O'Sullivan, West Virginia University Press, 2017

Awards 

Malloy was shortlisted for the 2017 Hayles Prize Social Media Archeology and Poetics, MIT Press, 2016.

See also

List of electronic literature authors, critics, and works
Digital poetry
E-book#History
Electronic literature
Hypertext fiction
Interactive fiction
Literatronica

References

External links
Judy Malloy website
Art California Web

1942 births
Living people
American web producers
American women poets
Digital media educators
Electronic literature writers
Middlebury College alumni
MUD developers
Writers from Boston
Poets from California
Poets from Massachusetts
Princeton University faculty
American women academics
21st-century American women